Page Three – Sings a Collection of Her Most Famous Songs is a Patti Page LP album, issued by Mercury Records as catalog number MG-20097 in 1957.
This was the third album in a series of four, titled "Page 1" to "Page 4.

Track listing

References

Mercury Records compilation albums
Patti Page albums
1957 compilation albums